Ramsey is a village on the B1352 road (near the A120 road), near the town of Harwich, in the Tendring district, in the English county of Essex. It has a pub called the Castle Inn The village forms part of the civil parish of Ramsey and Parkeston.

The Domesday Book (1086) records two parcels of land in the area, "Michaelstou" and "Rameseia". These were later divided into seven manors:
The manor of Roydon Hall
The manor of Ramsey Hall
The manor of Michaelstowe
The manor of East New Hall
The manor of Strondland
The manor of Le Rey (Ray Island)
The manor of Foulton

See also 
 Ramsey Windmill, Essex
 Michaelstowe Hall

References 

 A-Z Essex (page 208)

Villages in Essex
Tendring